Samuel B. Ringgold (1796 – May 11, 1846) was an artillery officer in the United States Army who was noted for several military innovations which caused him to be called the "Father of Modern Artillery." He was also, according to some records, the first U.S. officer to fall in the Mexican–American War, perishing from wounds received at the Battle of Palo Alto.

Early life and career
Ringgold was the son of Samuel Ringgold, a U.S. Congressman from Maryland. A younger brother, Cadwallader Ringgold, served in the navy, becoming a rear admiral.

On July 24, 1818, Samuel Ringgold graduated 5th in a class of 23 from the United States Military Academy at West Point. He was commissioned a Second Lieutenant in the Artillery.

In the early 1820s, Ringgold was on the staff of General Winfield Scott. At about that time, (roughly 1825) John Vanderlyn, then working in New York City, painted Ringgold's portrait.

Ringgold's significant military innovations included the Ringgold military saddle and artillery techniques. Based on his research in Europe, he rewrote the Army's manual for artillery, which included the tactical concept of flying artillery—employing artillery pieces that could be moved quickly from place to place. The Army adapted his manual, "Instructions for Field Artillery" on March 6, 1845, and he was promoted to the rank of Major in acknowledgment of his military innovations.

Mexican–American War
Ringgold served in General Zachary Taylor's occupation force in Texas as a Major of Artillery. On May 8, 1846, as he and 2,400 troops were en route to Fort Texas, they were engaged at the Battle of Palo Alto by Mexican General Mariano Arista and his force of 3,800 men.

Arista's army was stretched a mile wide, making an American bayonet charge, Taylor's first option, impossible. Taylor, in an unlikely move, advanced his artillery to attack the enemy. The use of Ringgold's flying artillery tactic won the battle for the Americans. The Mexican artillery, heavy and slow, was futile in the thick steel-wool brush at Palo Alto. Arista ordered cavalry charges to flank the artillery gunners, but the American flying artillery was able to mobilize, relocate, and repel the oncoming dragoons.

During the battle, Ringgold was mortally wounded by cannon fire that mangled both his legs just below the crotch. Nevertheless, he refused to leave the field during the battle. He survived three days, during which time he debriefed on the battle, before dying in Port Isabel, Texas.

Robert D'Unger, then journalist at the Baltimore Democrat, claimed that he was the first to report news by telegraph while reporting Ringgold's death.

Commemoration

His bravery was a boost to morale through the military and the country.  Songs, poetry, plays were written about him, including a mention in the fourth verse of Maryland, My Maryland. A song entitled "The Death of Ringgold," commemorating his death, was a popular patriotic song in the US during the war.  John H. Hewitt wrote a song, "On to the Charge", and dedicated it to the late Major Ringgold.

Cities and counties were named in his honor, including:
 Ringgold, Georgia (Catoosa County seat)
 Ringgold, Louisiana
 Ringgold, Virginia
 Ringgold, Maryland
 Ringgold Township, Pennsylvania
 Ringgold County, Iowa
 New Ringgold, Pennsylvania

Also:

 The Ringgold Civic Park in Brownsville, Texas was named after him as well as Ringgold Street at the University of Texas at Brownsville.
 Fort Ringgold, constructed after the Mexican War in 1848 to protect the Mexican border, was named after him. It is located in Rio Grande City, Texas. The Fort is currently the home of Ringgold Elementary and Ringgold Middle School.
 U.S. Army Mine Planter Major Samuel Ringgold built 1904.
 Ringgold Fire Company, Pulaski, New York.

Family tree

References

External links

 Samuel Ringgold, Mexican–American War Officer
 Military biography of Samuel Ringgold from the Cullum biographies
 Daguerreotype

United States Military Academy alumni
American military personnel killed in the Mexican–American War
1796 births
1846 deaths
Military personnel from Maryland
United States Army officers